Savage Salvation (also titled Wash Me in the River) is a 2022 American thriller film directed by Randall Emmett and starring Jack Huston, Robert De Niro, and John Malkovich.

Premise
After losing his fiancée to a heroin overdose, a rehabilitated addict seeks revenge on the cartel responsible for supplying the drugs with a sympathetic sheriff on his tail.

Cast
 Jack Huston as Shelby John
 Robert De Niro as Sheriff Mike Church 
 John Malkovich as Peter
 Willa Fitzgerald as Ruby Red
 Quavo as Coyote
 Meadow Williams as Detective Zeppelin
 Dale Dickey as Greta
 Swen Temmel as Elvis Kincaid
 Noel Gugliemi as Silas
 Jon Orsini as Skeeter
 Clay Wilcox as Darius
 Winter Ave Zoli as Darlene

Production
On September 8, 2020, it was announced that De Niro, Malkovich and Machine Gun Kelly were cast in the film.  On October 19, 2020, it was announced that Taylor Kitsch had replaced Machine Gun Kelly after the latter dropped out due to scheduling conflicts.  On November 13, 2020, it was then announced that Jack Huston had replaced Kitsch. Production on the film began in November 2020. Malkovich filmed his scenes in December 2020.  Filming officially wrapped in January 2021, and the following month, it was announced that Quavo and Willa Fitzgerald would star in the film.

Release
In March 2021, The Avenue Entertainment acquired North American distribution rights to the film, with intentions to release in early 2022.

References

External links
 

2022 films
American thriller films
2020s English-language films
2020s American films